Jelena Dokić and Elena Likhovtseva were the defending champions, but Likhovtseva chose not to compete in 2003. Dokić played with Nadia Petrova, but lost in the quarterfinals.

Liezel Huber and Martina Navratilova won the title.

Results

Seeds

  Jelena Dokić /  Nadia Petrova (quarterfinals)
  Liezel Huber /  Martina Navratilova (champions)
  Barbara Schett /  Patty Schnyder (semifinals)
  Els Callens /  Émilie Loit (semifinals)

Draw

References

Sarasota Clay Court Classic - Doubles
Tennis tournaments in Florida
2003 in American tennis